Hilton is a locality in the Canterbury Region of the South Island of New Zealand. The Kakahu River flows through the area.

History 
The area was initially taken up by Captain Richard Westenra in 1853 as part of Kakahu Station. The next decade saw the rise of saw milling in the region and more intensive farming, contributing to rapid growth in the region.  By 1876 the settlement consisted of a blacksmith shop, a general store, a barbers shop, a school and a post office.

In 1891 the Hilton Hotel (not to be confused Hilton Hotels & Resorts est.1919) which was described as a grandiose two-storeyed, 14-roomed hotel, was burnt to the ground when H.D.D Homes deliberately set fire to in an attempt to salvage insurance money.  The hotel had fallen on hard times and Homes would later be charged and sentenced to four years penal servitude.

Hilton School was first opened in 1875, in 1924 it was modernised and rebuilt being opened by Thomas Hughes, the original master in 1875. The roll would fluctuate between 90 and 20 children with a notable increase when the nearby Gapes Valley School closed.  In 2005 the unpopular decision to close schools in the region including Hilton School was made by then-Education Minister, Labour's Trevor Mallard.

The Hilton Hall was officially opened in October 1916. It is still used today for community events, including the annual Christmas function and is maintained by a committee. Otherwise Hilton Community members generally rely on the nearby town of Geraldine.

Notable people 
 Jeremiah Connolly (1875–1935), Member of Parliament for Mid-Canterbury
 Walter Scott (1902–1985), notable New Zealand teacher, lecturer, educationalist, teachers' college principal and civil libertarian

Economy 
The local economy is predominantly driven by farming, and two limestone quarries also operate in the area.

References 

Timaru District
Populated places in Canterbury, New Zealand